The Atari 2600 is a home video game console developed and produced by Atari, Inc. Released in September 1977, it popularized microprocessor-based hardware and games stored on swappable ROM cartridges, a format first used with the Fairchild Channel F in 1976. Branded as the Atari Video Computer System (Atari VCS) from its release until November 1982, the VCS was bundled with two joystick controllers, a conjoined pair of paddle controllers, and a game cartridgeinitially Combat and later Pac-Man.

Atari was successful at creating arcade video games, but their development cost and limited lifespan drove CEO Nolan Bushnell to seek a programmable home system. The first inexpensive microprocessors from MOS Technology in late 1975 made this feasible. The console was prototyped as codename Stella by Atari subsidiary Cyan Engineering. Lacking funding to complete the project, Bushnell sold Atari to Warner Communications in 1976.

The Atari VCS launched in 1977 with nine simple, low-resolution games in 2 KB cartridges. The system's first killer app was the home conversion of Taito's arcade game Space Invaders in 1980. The VCS became widely successful, leading to the founding of Activision and other third-party game developers and to competition from console manufacturers Mattel and Coleco. By the end of its primary lifecycle in 1983–84, games for the 2600 were using more than four times the storage size of the launch games with significantly more advanced visuals and gameplay than the system was designed for, such as Activision's Pitfall!

In 1982, the Atari 2600 was the dominant game system in North America. Amid competition from both new consoles and game developers, a number of poor decisions from Atari management affected the company and the industry as a whole. The most public was an extreme investment into licensed games for the 2600, including Pac-Man and E.T. the Extra-Terrestrial. Pac-Man became the system's biggest selling game, but the conversion's poor quality eroded consumer confidence in the console. E.T. was rushed to market for the holiday shopping season and was critically panned and a commercial failure. Both games, and a glut of third-party shovelware, were factors in ending Atari's relevance in the console market. Atari's downfall reverberated through the industry resulting in the video game crash of 1983.

Warner sold Atari's home division to former Commodore CEO Jack Tramiel in 1984. In 1986, the new Atari Corporation under Tramiel released a lower-cost version of the 2600 and the backward-compatible Atari 7800, but it was Nintendo that led the recovery of the industry with its 1985 launch of the Nintendo Entertainment System. Production of the Atari 2600 ended on January 1, 1992, with an estimated 30 million units sold across its lifetime.

History

Atari, Inc. was founded by Nolan Bushnell and Ted Dabney in 1972. Its first major product was Pong, released in 1972, the first successful coin-operated video game. While Atari continued to develop new arcade games in following years, Pong gave rise to a number of competitors to the growing arcade game market. The competition along with other missteps by Atari led to financial problems in 1974, though recovering by the end of the year. By 1975, Atari had released a Pong home console, competing against Magnavox, the only other major producer of home consoles at the time. Atari engineers recognized, however, the limitation of custom logic integrated onto the circuit board, permanently confining the whole console to only one game. The increasing competition increased the risk, as Atari had found with past arcade games and again with dedicated home consoles. Both platforms are built from integrating discrete electro-mechanical components into circuits, rather than programmed as on a mainframe computer. Therefore, development of a console had cost at least  plus time to complete, but the final product only had about a three-month shelf life until becoming outdated by competition.

By 1974, Atari had acquired Cyan Engineering, a Grass Valley electronics company founded by Steve Mayer and Larry Emmons, both former colleagues of Bushnell and Dabney from Ampex, who helped to develop new ideas for Atari's arcade games. Even prior to the release of the home version of Pong, Cyan's engineers, led by Mayer and Ron Milner, had envisioned a home console powered by new programmable microprocessors capable of playing Atari's current arcade offerings. The programmable microprocessors would make a console's design significantly simpler and more powerful than any dedicated single-game unit. However, the cost  of such chips was far outside the range that their market would tolerate. Atari had opened negotiations to use Motorola's new 6800 in future systems.

MOS Technology 6502/6507
Mayer and Milner attended, and met with the leader of the team that created the chip, Chuck Peddle. They proposed using the 6502 in a game console, and offered to discuss it further at Cyan's facilities after the show.

Over two days, MOS and Cyan engineers sketched out a 6502-based console design by Meyer and Milner's specifications. Cyan and MOS negotiated the 6507 and RIOT chips at  a pair. MOS also introduced Cyan to Microcomputer Associates, who had separately developed debugging software and hardware for MOS, and had developed the JOLT Computer for testing the 6502, which Peddle suggested would be useful for Atari and Cyan to use while developing their system. Milner was able to demonstrate a proof-of-concept for a programmable console by implementing Tank, an arcade game by Atari's subsidiary Kee Games, on the JOLT.

As part of the deal, Atari wanted a second source of the chipset. Peddle and Paivinen suggested Synertek whose co-founder, Bob Schreiner, was a friend of Peddle. In October 1975, Atari informed the market that it was moving forward with MOS. The Motorola sales team had already told its management that the Atari deal was finalized, and Motorola management was livid. They announced a lawsuit against MOS the next week.

Building the system

By December 1975, Atari hired Joe Decuir, a recent graduate from University of California, Berkeley who had been doing his own testing on the 6502. Decuir began debugging the first prototype designed by Mayer and Milner, which gained the codename "Stella" after the brand of Decuir's bicycle. This prototype included a breadboard-level design of the graphics interface to build upon. A second prototype was completed by March 1976 with the help of Jay Miner, who created a chip called the Television Interface Adaptor (TIA) to send graphics and audio to a television. The second prototype included a TIA, a 6507, and a ROM cartridge slot and adapter.

As the TIA's design was refined, Al Alcorn brought in Atari's game developers to provide input on features. There are significant limitations in the 6507, the TIA, and other components, so the programmers creatively optimized their games to maximize the console. The console lacks a framebuffer and requires games to instruct the system to generate graphics in synchronization with the electron gun in the cathode-ray tube (CRT) as it scans across rows on the screen. The programmers found ways to "race the beam" to perform other functions while the electron gun scans outside of the visible screen.

Alongside the electronics development, Bushnell brought in Gene Landrum, a consultant who had just prior consulted for Fairchild Camera and Instrument for its upcoming Channel F, to determine the consumer requirements for the console. In his final report, Landrum suggested a living room aesthetic, with a wood grain finish, and the cartridges must be "idiot proof, child proof and effective in resisting potential static [electricity] problems in a living room environment". Landrum recommended it include four to five dedicated games in addition to the cartridges, but this was dropped in the final designs. The cartridge design was done by James Asher and Douglas Hardy. Hardy had been an engineer for Fairchild and helped in the initial design of the Channel F cartridges, but he quit to join Atari in 1976. The interior of the cartridge that Asher and Hardy designed was sufficiently different to avoid patent conflicts, but the exterior components were directly influenced by the Channel F to help work around the static electricity concerns.

Atari was still recovering from its 1974 financial woes and needed additional capital to fully enter the home console market, though Bushnell was wary of being beholden to outside financial sources. Atari obtained smaller investments through 1975, but not at the scale it needed, and began considering a sale to a larger firm by early 1976. Atari was introduced to Warner Communications, which saw the potential for the growing video game industry to help offset declining profits from its film and music divisions. Negotiations took place during 1976, during which Atari cleared itself of liabilities, including settling a patent infringement lawsuit with Magnavox over Ralph H. Baer's patents that were the basis for the Magnavox Odyssey. In mid-1976, Fairchild announced the Channel F, planned for release later that year, beating Atari to the market.

Warner provided an estimated  which was enough to fast-track Stella. By 1977, development had advanced enough to brand it the "Atari Video Computer System" (VCS) and start developing games.

Launch and success

The unit was showcased on June 4, 1977, at the Summer Consumer Electronics Show with plans for retail release in October. The announcement was purportedly delayed to wait out the terms of the Magnavox patent lawsuit settlement, which would have given Magnavox all technical information on any of Atari's products announced between June 1, 1976, and June 1, 1977. However, Atari encountered production problems during its first batch, and its testing was complicated by the use of cartridges.

Most of the launch games were based on arcade games developed by Atari or its subsidiary Kee Games: for example, Combat was based on Kee's Tank (1974) and Atari's Jet Fighter (1975). Atari sold between 350,000 and 400,000 Atari VCS units during 1977, attributed to the delay in shipping the units and consumers' unfamiliarity with a swappable-cartridge console that is not dedicated to only one game.

In 1978, Atari sold only 550,000 of the 800,000 systems manufactured. This required further financial support from Warner to cover losses. Atari sold 1 million consoles in 1979, particularly during the holiday season, but there was new competition from the Mattel Electronics Intellivision and Magnavox Odyssey², which also use swappable ROM cartridges.

Atari obtained a license from Taito to develop a VCS conversion of its 1978 arcade hit Space Invaders. This is the first officially licensed arcade conversion for a home console. Its release in March 1980 doubled the console's sales for the year to more than 2 million units, and was considered the Atari 2600's killer application. Sales then doubled again for the next two years; by 1982, 10 million consoles had been sold in the United States, while its best-selling game was Pac-Man at over  copies sold by 1990. Pac-Man propelled worldwide Atari VCS sales to  units during 1982, eventually selling  consoles worldwide by the end of the year.

In Europe, the Atari VCS sold 125,000 units in the United Kingdom during 1980, and 450,000 in West Germany by 1984. In France, where the VCS released in 1982, the system sold 600,000 units by 1989.

In 1982, Atari launched its second programmable console, the Atari 5200. To standardize naming, the VCS was renamed to the "Atari 2600 Video Computer System", or "Atari 2600", derived from the manufacture part number CX2600.

Third-party development
Activision, formed by Crane, Whitehead, and Miller in 1979, started developing third-party VCS games using their knowledge of VCS design and programming tricks, and began releasing games in 1980. Kaboom! (1981) and Pitfall! (1982) are among the most successful with at least one and four million copies sold, respectively. In 1980, Atari attempted to block the sale of the Activision cartridges, accusing the four of intellectual property infringement. The two companies settled out of court, with Activision agreeing to pay Atari a licensing fee for their games. This made Activision the first third-party video game developer and established the licensing model that continues to be used by console manufacturers for game development.

Activision's success led to the establishment of other third-party VCS game developers following Activision's model in the early 1980s, including U.S. Games, Telesys, Games by Apollo, Data Age, Zimag, Mystique, and CommaVid. The founding of Imagic included ex-Atari programmers. Mattel and Coleco, each already producing its own more advanced console, created simplified versions of their existing games for the 2600. Mattel used the M Network brand name for its cartridges. Third-party games accounted for half of VCS game sales by 1982.

Decline and redesign
In addition to third-party game development, Atari also received the first major threat to its hardware dominance from the Colecovision. Coleco had a license from Nintendo to develop a version of the smash hit arcade game Donkey Kong (1981), which was bundled with every Colecovision console. Coleco gained about 17% of the hardware market in 1982 compared to Atari's 58%. With third parties competing for market share, Atari worked to maintain dominance in the market by acquiring licenses for popular arcade games and other properties to make games from. Pac-Man has numerous technical and aesthetic flaws, but nevertheless more than 7 million copies were sold. Heading into the 1982 holiday shopping season, Atari had placed high sales expectations on E.T. the Extra-Terrestrial, a game programmed in about six weeks.  Atari produced an estimated four million cartridges, but the game was poorly reviewed, and only about 1.5 million units were sold.

Warner Communications reported weaker results than expected in December 1982 to its shareholders, having expected a 50% year-to-year growth but only obtaining 10–15% due to declining sales at Atari. Coupled with the oversaturated home game market, Atari's weakened position led investors to start pulling funds out of video games, beginning a cascade of disastrous effects known as the video game crash of 1983. Many of the third-party developers formed prior to 1983 were closed, and Mattel and Coleco left the video game market by 1985.

In September 1983, Atari sent 14 truckloads of unsold Atari 2600 cartridges and other equipment to a landfill in the New Mexico desert, later labeled the Atari video game burial. Long considered an urban legend that claimed the burial contained millions of unsold cartridges, the site was excavated in 2014, confirming reports from former Atari executives that only about 700,000 cartridges had actually been buried. Atari reported a  loss for 1983 as a whole, and continued to lose money into 1984, with a  loss reported in the second quarter. By mid-1984, software development for the 2600 had essentially stopped except that of Atari and Activision.

Warner, wary of supporting its failing Atari division, started looking for buyers in 1984. Tramiel was a proponent of personal computers, and halted all new 2600 game development soon after the sale.

The North American video game market did not recover until about 1986, after Nintendo's 1985 launch of the Nintendo Entertainment System in North America. Atari Corporation released a redesigned model of the 2600 in 1986, supported by an ad campaign touting a price of "under 50 bucks". With a large library of cartridges and a low price point, the 2600 continued to sell into the late 1980s. Atari released the last batch of games in 1989–90 including Secret Quest and Fatal Run. By 1986, over  Atari VCS units had been sold worldwide. The final Atari-licensed release is the PAL-only version of the arcade game KLAX in 1990.

After more than 14 years on the market, the 2600 line was formally discontinued on January 1, 1992, along with the Atari 7800 and Atari 8-bit family of home computers.

Hardware

Console

The Atari 2600's CPU is the MOS Technology 6507, a version of the 6502, running at 1.19 MHz in the 2600. Though their internal silicon was identical, the 6507 was cheaper than the 6502 because its package included fewer memory-address pins—13 instead of 16. The designers of the Atari 2600 selected an inexpensive cartridge interface that has one fewer address than the 13 allowed by the 6507, further reducing the already limited addressable memory to 4 KB (212 = 4096). This was believed to be sufficient as Combat is itself only 2 KB. Later games circumvented this limitation with bank switching.

The console has 128 bytes of RAM for scratch space, the call stack, and the state of the game environment.

The top bezel of the console originally had six switches: power, TV type selection (color or black-and-white), game selection, player difficulty, and game reset. The difficulty switches were moved to the back of the bezel in later versions of the console. The back bezel also included the controller ports, TV output, and power input.

Graphics

The Atari 2600 was designed to be compatible with the cathode-ray tube television sets produced in the late 1970s and early 1980s, which commonly lack auxiliary video inputs to receive audio and video from another device. Therefore, to connect to a TV, the console generates a radio frequency signal compatible with the regional television standards (NTSC, PAL, or SECAM), using a special switch box to act as the television's antenna.

Atari developed the Television Interface Adaptor (TIA) chip in the VCS to handle the graphics and conversion to a television signal. It provides a single-color, 20-bit background register that covers the left half of the screen (each bit represents 4 adjacent pixels) and is either repeated or reflected on the right side. There are 5 single-color sprites: two 8-pixel wide players; two 1 bit missiles, which share the same colors as the players; and a 1-pixel ball, which shares the background color. The 1-bit sprites all can be controlled to stretch to 1, 2, 4, or 8 pixels.

The system was designed without a frame buffer to avoid the cost of the associated RAM. The background and sprites apply to a single scan line, and as the display is output to the television, the program can change colors, sprite positions, and background settings. The careful timing required to sync the code to the screen on the part of the programmer was labeled "racing the beam"; the actual game logic runs when the television beam is outside of the visible area of the screen. Early games for the system use the same visuals for pairs of scan lines, giving a lower vertical resolution, to allow more time for the next row of graphics to be prepared. Later games, such as Pitfall!, change the visuals for each scan line or extend the black areas around the screen to extend the game code's processing time.

Regional releases of the Atari 2600 use modified TIA chips for each region's television formats, which require games to be developed and published separately for each region. All modes are 160 pixels wide. NTSC mode provides 192 visible lines per screen, drawn at 60 Hz, with 16 colors, each at 8 levels of brightness. PAL mode provides more vertical scanlines, with 228 visible lines per screen, but drawn at 50 Hz and only 13 colors. SECAM mode, also a 50 Hz format, is limited to 8 colors, each with only a single brightness level.

Controllers

The first VCS bundle has two types of controllers: a joystick (part number CX10) and pair of rotary paddle controllers (CX30). Driving controllers, which are similar to paddle controllers but can be continuously rotated, shipped with the Indy 500 launch game. After less than a year, the CX10 joystick was replaced with the CX40 model designed by James C. Asher. Because the Atari joystick port and CX40 joystick became industry standards, 2600 joysticks and some other peripherals work with later systems, including the MSX, Commodore 64, Amiga, Atari 8-bit family, and Atari ST. The CX40 joystick can be used with the Master System and Sega Genesis, but does not provide all the buttons of a native controller. Third-party controllers include Wico's Command Control joystick. Later, the CX42 Remote Control Joysticks, similar in appearance but using wireless technology, were released, together with a receiver whose wires could be inserted in the controller jacks.

Atari introduced the CX50 Keyboard Controller in June 1978 along with two games that require it: Codebreaker and Hunt & Score. The similar, but simpler, CX23 Kid's Controller was released later for a series of games aimed at a younger audience. The CX22 Trak-Ball controller was announced in January 1983 and is compatible with the Atari 8-bit family.

There were two attempts to turn the Atari 2600 into a keyboard-equipped home computer: Atari's never-released CX3000 "Graduate" keyboard, and the CompuMate keyboard by Spectravideo which was released in 1983.

Console models

Minor revisions
The initial production of the VCS was made in Sunnyvale during 1977, using thick polystyrene plastic for the casing as to give the impression of weight from what was mostly an empty shell inside. The initial Sunnyvale batch had also included potential mounts for an internal speaker system on the casing, though the speakers were found to be too expensive to include and instead sound was routed through the TIA to the connected television. All six console switches on the front panel. Production of the unit was moved to Taiwan in 1978, where a less thick internal metal shielding was used and thinner plastic was used for the casing, reducing the system's weight. These two versions are commonly referred to as "Heavy Sixers" and "Light Sixers" respectively, referencing the six front switches.

In 1980, the difficulty switches were moved to the back of the console, leaving four switches on the front. Otherwise, these four-switch consoles look nearly identical to the earlier six-switch models. In 1982 Atari rebranded the console as the "Atari 2600", a name first used on a version of the four-switch model without woodgrain, giving it an all-black appearance.

Sears Video Arcade 
Atari continued its OEM relationship with Sears under the latter's Tele-Games brand, which started in 1975 with the original Pong. This is unrelated to the company Telegames, which later produced 2600 cartridges. Sears released several models of the VCS as the Sears Video Arcade series starting in 1977. In 1983, the previously Japan-only Atari 2800 was rebranded as the Sears Video Arcade II.

Sears released versions of Atari's games with Tele-Games branding, usually with different titles. Three games were produced by Atari for Sears as exclusive releases: Steeplechase, Stellar Track, and Submarine Commander.

Atari 2800 
The Atari 2800 is the Japanese version of the 2600 released in October 1983. It is the first Japan-specific release of a 2600, though companies like Epoch had distributed the 2600 in Japan previously. The 2800 was released a short time after Nintendo's Family Computer (which became the dominant console in Japan), and it did not gain a significant share of the market. Sears released the 2800 in the US in 1983 as the Sears Video Arcade II packaged with two controllers and Space Invaders. Around 30 specially branded games were released for the 2800.

Designed by engineer Joe Tilly, the 2800 has four controller ports instead of the two of the 2600. The controllers are an all-in one design using a combination of an 8-direction digital joystick and a 270-degree paddle, designed by John Amber. The 2800's case design departed from the 2600, using a wedge shape with non-protruding switches. The case style is the basis for the Atari 7800, designed by Barney Huang.

Atari 2600 Jr.
The 1986 model has a smaller, cost-reduced form factor with an Atari 7800-like appearance. It was advertised as a budget gaming system (under ) with the ability to run a large collection of games. Released after the video game crash of 1983, and after the North American launch of the Nintendo Entertainment System, the 2600 was supported with new games and television commercials promoting "The fun is back!". Atari released several minor stylistic variations: the "large rainbow" (shown), "short rainbow", and an all-black version sold only in Ireland. Later European versions include a joypad.

Games

In 1977, nine games were released on cartridge to accompany the launch of the console: Air-Sea Battle, Basic Math, Blackjack, Combat, Indy 500, Star Ship, Street Racer, Surround, and Video Olympics. Indy 500 shipped with special "driving controllers", which are like paddles but rotate freely. Street Racer and Video Olympics use the standard paddle controllers.

Atari determined that box art featuring only descriptions of the game and screenshots would not be sufficient to sell games in retail stores, since most games were based on abstract principles and screenshots give little information. Atari outsourced box art to Cliff Spohn, who created visually interesting artwork with implications of dynamic movement intended to engage the player's imagination while staying true to the gameplay. Spohn's style became a standard for Atari when bringing in assistant artists, including Susan Jaekel, Rick Guidice, John Enright, and Steve Hendricks. Spohn and Hendricks were the largest contributors to the covers in the Atari 2600 library. Ralph McQuarrie, a concept artist on the Star Wars series, was commissioned for one cover, the arcade conversion of Vanguard. These artists generally conferred with the programmer to learn about the game before drawing the art.

An Atari VCS port of the Breakout arcade game appeared in 1978. The original is in black and white with a colored overlay, and the home version is in color. In 1980, Atari released Adventure, the first action-adventure game, and the first home game with a hidden Easter egg.

Rick Maurer's port of Taito's Space Invaders, released in 1980, is the first VCS game to have more than one million copies sold—eventually doubling that within a year and totaling more than  cartridges by 1983. It became the killer app to drive console sales. Versions of Atari's own Asteroids and Missile Command arcade games, released in 1981, were also major hits.

Each early VCS game is in a 2K ROM. Later games like Space Invaders, have 4K. The VCS port of Asteroids (1981) is the first game for the system to use 8K via a bank switching technique between two 4K segments. Some later releases, including Atari's ports of Dig Dug and Crystal Castles, are 16K cartridges. One of the final games, Fatal Run (1990), doubled this to 32K.

Atari, Inc. was the only developer for the first few years, releasing dozens of games.

Two Atari-published games, both from the system's peak in 1982, E.T. the Extra-Terrestrial and Pac-Man, are cited as factors in the video game crash of 1983.

A company named Mystique produced a number of pornographic games for the 2600. The most notorious, Custer's Revenge, was protested by women's and Native American groups because it depicted General George Armstrong Custer raping a bound Native American woman. Atari sued Mystique in court over the release of the game.

Legacy

The 2600 was so successful in the late 1970s and early 1980s that "Atari" was a synonym for the console in mainstream media and for video games in general. Jay Miner directed the creation of the successors to the 2600's TIA chip—CTIA and ANTIC—which are central to the Atari 8-bit computers released in 1979 and later the Atari 5200 console.

The Atari 2600 was inducted into the National Toy Hall of Fame at The Strong in Rochester, New York, in 2007. In 2009, the Atari 2600 was named the number two console of all time by IGN, which cited its remarkable role behind both the first video game boom and the video game crash of 1983, and called it "the console that our entire industry is built upon".

In November 2021, the current incarnation of Atari announced three 2600 games to be published under "Atari XP" label: Yars' Return, Aquaventure, and Saboteur. These were previously included in Atari Flashback consoles.

Clones and reissues
Modern Atari 2600 clones remain on the market. The Atari Classics 10-in-1 TV Game, manufactured by Jakks Pacific, emulates the 2600 with ten games inside a Atari-style joystick with composite-video output. The TV Boy includes 127 games in an enlarged joypad.

The Atari Flashback 2 console, released in 2005, contains 40 games, with four additional programs unlocked by a cheat code. The console implements the original 2600 architecture and can be modified to play original 2600 cartridges by adding a cartridge port; it is also compatible with original 2600 controllers.

In 2017, Hyperkin announced the RetroN 77, a clone of the Atari 2600 that plays original cartridges instead of preinstalled games.

The Atari VCS microconsole was released by Atari Interactive in 2021.

Unreleased prototypes
The Atari 2700 is a version of the 2600 using wireless controllers.

An Atari 2600 variant, known by its production code "CX2000" and nickname "Val", was found as two 1982 prototypes at the New York and Sunnyvale Atari facilities, respectively. It is a redesign of the aging 2600. Its design, with two integrated joystick controllers, is the result of human factor analysis by Henry Dreyfuss Associates. The project never reached market production.

Atari started work on a 2600 successor called the "Atari 3200". It was to be compatible with 2600 cartridges, and was rumored to be based on a 10-bit processor, although design documents show it was to be based on the 8-bit 6502. It was still unfinished when preliminary game developers discovered that it was difficult to program. Atari cloned the Atari 3200 into the Sears Super Arcade II, but this was never released.

Notes

References

Citations

General bibliography

External links

 A history of the Atari VCS/2600
 Inside the Atari 2600
 Hardware and prototypes at the Atari Museum

 
1970s toys
1980s toys
2600
Computer-related introductions in 1977
Home video game consoles
Products and services discontinued in 1992
Second-generation video game consoles
65xx-based video game consoles